Olindias is a genus of hydrozoans in the family Olindiidae.

Characteristics
Members of the genus Olindias have a dome-shaped bell, four radial canals and many centripetal canals. The gonads are beside the radial canals and have characteristic papilliform processes. There are a few primary tentacles growing part way down the bell with adhesive suckers and cnidocytes in bands. There are a pair of statocysts adjoining the base of each primary tentacle. There are a much larger number of short marginal tentacles with rings of cnidocytes for immobilising prey. Between these tentacles there are a number of club-shaped processes which may develop into tentacles.

Species
The World Register of Marine Species currently lists the following species:
Olindias formosus (Goto, 1903) - flower hat jelly
Olindias malayensis Maas, 1905
Olindias phosphorica (Delle Chiaje, 1841)
Olindias sambaquiensis Müller, 1861
Olindias singularis Browne, 1905
Olindias tenuis (Fewkes, 1882)

References

Olindiidae
Hydrozoan genera